The Maritime Major Hockey League was a semi-professional men's senior ice hockey league which operated for four seasons from 1950 to 1954, in New Brunswick and Nova Scotia. The league competed for the Alexander Cup as part of the Major Series operated by the Canadian Amateur Hockey Association (CAHA). Agreements were made with the National Hockey League to limit the number of players that could be drafted from the Major Series and the corresponding draft payment made to teams in the Maritime Major Hockey League.

CAHA president W. B. George announced that the Alexander Cup was to be retired due to the lack of interest. By October 1953, four of the original five leagues which competed for the trophy had withdrawn, with only the Maritime Major Hockey League remaining. George ruled out competing for the Allan Cup due to the semi-professional nature of the league and suggested a different trophy be awarded. Teams in the Maritimes accused George and the CAHA of trying to scuttle the league, and a compromise was reached where only the Maritime Major Hockey League competed for the Alexander Cup during the 1953–54 season.

Teams
List of Maritime Major Hockey League teams:

Season results
Lists of season-by-season results:

Legend: GP = games played, W = wins, L = losses, T = ties, GF = goals for, GA = goals against

1950–51 season
The Charlottetown Islanders were the 1950–51 season playoffs champions.

1951–52 season
The Saint John Beavers were the 1951–52 season playoffs champions.

1952–53 season
The Halifax Atlantics were the 1952–53 season playoffs champions.

1953–54 season
The Halifax Atlantics were the 1953–54 season playoffs champions.

See also
 Bud Poile, player-coach of the Glace Bay Miners

References

Defunct ice hockey leagues in New Brunswick
Defunct ice hockey leagues in Nova Scotia